Il mio canto libero (My Free Singing) is an album by the Italian singer-songwriter Lucio Battisti. It was released in November 1972 by Numero Uno.

The album was Italy's best-selling album in 1973.

Track listing 
All lyrics written by Mogol, all music composed by Lucio Battisti.
 "La luce dell'est" (The Light from the East) – 6:18
 "Luci-ah" – 4:47
 "L'aquila" (The Eagle) – 4:24
 "Vento nel vento" (Wind in the Wind) – 3:24
 "Confusione" (Confusion) – 4:30
 "Io vorrei… non vorrei… ma se vuoi…" (I'd Like… I Wouldn't Like… But If You Want…) – 4:35
 "Gente per bene e gente per male" (Good People and Bad People) – 4:46
 "Il mio canto libero" (A Song to Feel Alive) – 5:08

References

1972 albums
Lucio Battisti albums